The African pipit (Anthus cinnamomeus) is a fairly small passerine bird belonging to the pipit genus Anthus in the family Motacillidae. It is also known as the grassveld pipit or grassland pipit. It was formerly lumped together with the Richard's, Australian, mountain and paddyfield pipits in a single species, Richard's pipit (Anthus novaeseelandiae), but is now often treated as a species in its own right.

Subspecies
Some 15 subspecies are recognized:
 A. (c.) camaroonensis Shelley, 1900 – highlands of western Cameroon
 A. c. lynesi Bannerman & Bates, 1926 – southeastern Nigeria to southwestern Sudan
 A. c. stabilis Clancey, 1986 – locally in Sudan and South Sudan
 A. c. cinnamomeus Rüppell, 1840 – locally in Ethiopian highlands
 A. c. eximius Clancey, 1986 – southern Arabian peninsula
 A. c. annae R.Meinertzhagen, 1921 – coastal Horn of Africa to coastal Tanzania
 A. c. itombwensis Prigogine, 1981 – eastern highlands of the DRC
 A. c. lacuum R.Meinertzhagen, 1920 – perimeter of Lake Victoria to central Tanzania
 A. c. latistriatus F.J.Jackson, 1899 – seasonal vagrant from its Itombwe Mountains breeding range 
 A. c. winterbottomi Clancey, 1985 – highlands of Malawi and adjacent countries 
 A. c. lichenya Vincent, 1933 – plateaus of tropical and southcentral Africa, incl. Zimbabwean plateau 
 A. c. spurium Clancey, 1951 – lowlands of southcentral Africa to coastal lowlands of Mozambique
 A. c. bocagii Nicholson, 1884 – drier regions of southcentral Africa, reaching northern South Africa 
 A. c. grotei Niethammer, 1957 – higher rainfall regions of Namibia and Botswana
 A. c. rufuloides Roberts, 1936 – plateaus and lowlands of South Africa, Eswatini and Lesotho

Distribution and habitat
It occurs in grassland and fields in Southern, Central and East Africa, south-east of a line from Angola through the DRCongo to Sudan. It is also found in south-western Arabia. There is an isolated population in the highlands of Cameroon which is sometimes considered to be a separate species: Cameroon pipit (Anthus camaroonensis).

Description

It is buffy-brown above with darker streaks. The underparts are white or pale buff with a streaked breast and plain belly and flanks. The face is boldly patterned with a pale stripe over the eye and a dark malar stripe. The outer tail-feathers are white. The legs are long and pinkish and the slender bill is dark with a yellowish base to the lower mandible. Juvenile birds have a blotched breast, scalloping on the upperparts and some streaking on the flanks.

The song is a repeated series of twittering notes, given during an undulating song-flight or from a low perch.

The Cameroon pipit is slightly larger and darker with buff underparts.

Conservation status
Zimmerman, Turner, and Pearson (1999) call it "the common East African pipit", but BirdLife International has lumped the African pipit with Richard's pipit, and therefore has given it no separate conservation status.

Gallery

References

Peacock, Faansie (2006) Pipits of Southern Africa. Accessed 25/06/07.
Sinclair, Ian & Ryan, Peter (2003) Birds of Africa south of the Sahara, Struik, Cape Town.
Zimmerman, Dale A.; Turner, Donald A. & Pearson, David J. (1999) Birds of Kenya & Northern Tanzania, Christopher Helm, London.

External links

  African/Grassveld Pipit - Species text in The Atlas of Southern African Birds.

Anthus
Birds of Africa
Birds of Southern Africa
Birds of Sub-Saharan Africa
Birds described in 1840